Valeri Malyshev may refer to:
 Valeri Aleksandrovich Malyshev, Soviet actor who played in the movie Dead Souls
 Valeri Malyshev (politician), former vice-governor of Saint Petersburg
 Valeri Mikhailovich Malyshev (b. 1980), Russian footballer